Basil Reid (17 May 1924 – 16 July 2000) was an Australian cricketer. He played six first-class matches for Tasmania between 1949 and 1953.

See also
 List of Tasmanian representative cricketers

References

External links
 

1924 births
2000 deaths
Australian cricketers
Tasmania cricketers
Cricketers from Launceston, Tasmania